David Walter LaFary (born January 13, 1955 in Cincinnati, Ohio) is a former American football tackle in the National Football League for the New Orleans Saints. LaFary attended Purdue University, and played tackle for La Salle High School.

1955 births
Living people
American football offensive linemen
Purdue Boilermakers football players
New Orleans Saints players